Younes Bahonar (born on April 12, 1977) is a retired Iranian football player. He has played for Persepolis. In his late years of his career, he Captained three Tabrizi clubs: Tractor, Machine Sazi and Gostaresh.

Club career 
In 1991, he joined Tavanir Club at East Azerbaijan Province League and then Basij Tabriz. He finally joined Tabriz number one team Tractor in 1996.

Club Career Statistics

Honours

Club
Persepolis
Persian Gulf Pro League (1) : 2001–02

References

1977 births
Living people
Sportspeople from Tabriz
Iranian footballers
Iran international footballers
Persepolis F.C. players
Tractor S.C. players
Machine Sazi F.C. players
Association football defenders